Salford was a borough constituency represented in the House of Commons of the Parliament of the United Kingdom. It elected one Member of Parliament (MP) by the first past the post system of election. The borough constituency dated from 1997 and was abolished in 2010, replaced by Salford and Eccles.

A parliamentary borough of the same name existed from 1832 to 1885. The historic constituency returned two members of parliament from 1868.

Boundaries

Boundaries 1832–1885 
In 1832 the constituency was formed from the townships of Broughton, Pendleton and Salford, with part of the township of Pendlebury. The exact boundaries were defined in the Parliamentary Boundaries Act 1832:
From the Northernmost Point at which the Boundary of the Township of Salford meets the Boundary of the Township of Broughton, Northward, along the Boundary of the Township of Broughton, to the Point at which the same meets the Boundary of the Township of Pendleton; thence, Westward, along the Boundary of the Township of Pendleton to the Point at which the same meets the Boundary of the detached Portion of the Township of Pendlebury; thence, Southward, along the Boundary of the detached Portion of the Township of Pendlebury to the Point at which the same meets the Boundary of the Township of Salford; thence, Westward, along the Boundary of the Township of Salford to the Point first described.

In 1883 the detached portion of Pendlebury was absorbed by Pendleton.

Boundaries 1997–2010 

The constituency was re-created for the 1997 election. It boundaries were defined by the Parliamentary Constituencies (England) Order 1995, and consisted of eight wards of the City of Salford: Blackfriars, Broughton, Claremont, Kersal, Langworthy, Ordsall, Pendleton, and Weaste & Seedley.

A very safe Labour seat which had some of the UK's most deprived areas, typified by council estates like Ordsall, Pendleton and Langworthy, which are now due for apparent redevelopment. Higher Broughton has a considerable Jewish population and has some very decent residential housing, but even here Labour are usually in the lead at local level; the Conservatives, like all the other neighbouring Manchester seats, are now in third place in General Elections.

Boundary Review

Following its review of parliamentary representation in Greater Manchester the Boundary Commission for England recommended that Salford be split into three new constituencies and this was enacted in 2010:

Blackley and Broughton, a cross-border constituency formed with wards in the current Manchester Blackley seat.
Salford and Eccles takes the existing Salford seat and marries it with central electoral wards of Eccles
Worsley and Eccles South brings Walkden, Worsley and Eccles together in a new seat following the removal of the Wigan-Salford link

Members of Parliament

MPs 1832–1868

MPs 1868–1885

MPs 1997–2010

Elections

Elections in the 2000s

Elections in the 1990s

Elections in the 1880s

Elections in the 1870s

 Caused by Cawley's death.

Elections in the 1860s

 
 

 Seat increased to two members

 Caused by Massey's resignation after his appointment as a member of the Council of India.

Elections in the 1850s

 Caused by Brotherton's death

Elections in the 1840s

Elections in the 1830s

See also
 List of parliamentary constituencies in Greater Manchester

Notes and references

Parliamentary constituencies in Greater Manchester (historic)
Constituencies of the Parliament of the United Kingdom established in 1832
Constituencies of the Parliament of the United Kingdom disestablished in 1885
Constituencies of the Parliament of the United Kingdom established in 1997
Constituencies of the Parliament of the United Kingdom disestablished in 2010
Politics of Salford